The following lists events that happened during 1912 in New Zealand.

The 1911 General Election, the first contested by the Reform Party, left parliament in an indeterminate state, with Reform holding 38 seats, Liberal 36, Labour 1 and with 5 independents.

Liberal, who had been in government for the past 21 years, claimed that Reform did not have a mandate, since many of their seats were the smaller rural electorates, and the Liberals proceeded to form a government under Joseph Ward as per the previous two parliaments.

Such were the loyalties of the independent members that votes were often deadlocked and dependent upon the casting vote of the Speaker. As a result, Joseph Ward resigned on 28 March, to be succeeded by agriculture minister Thomas Mackenzie. However, the government was defeated on the next occasion that parliament met, and the first Reform Government was formed under William Massey in July.

Incumbents

Regal and viceregal
Head of State - George V
Governor - The Lord Islington GCMG GBE DSO PC, succeeded the same year by The Earl of Liverpool

Government
Speaker of the House - Arthur Guinness - (Liberal)
Prime Minister - Joseph Ward until 28 March, then Thomas Mackenzie (Liberal) until 10 July, then William Massey (Reform)
Minister of Finance - Joseph Ward until 28 March, then Arthur Myers (Liberal) until 10 July, then James Allen (Reform)
Chief Justice — Sir Robert Stout

Parliamentary opposition
Leader of the Opposition - William Massey (Reform Party) until 10 July. The Liberal opposition had no recognised leader until the following year.

Main centre leaders
Mayor of Auckland - James Parr
Mayor of Wellington - David McLaren
Mayor of Christchurch - John Joseph Dougall then Henry Holland
Mayor of Dunedin - William Burnett then John Wilson

Events 

 24 February: The TSS Earnslaw launched at Kingston on Lake Wakatipu.
 28 March: Prime Minister Joseph Ward resigns and is replaced by Thomas Mackenzie.
 April: Pelorus Jack is seen for the last time.
 May: Waihi miners' strike commences. 
 10 July: William Massey sworn in as Prime Minister after the Liberal Party loses a vote of no confidence.
September–October: French director Gaston Méliès and a company of film-makers make eight films in New Zealand including the first New Zealand feature films; see The River Wanganui. 
 October: Waihi Goldmining Company reopens the mine with scab labour.
 18 October: The TSS Earnslaw makes her maiden voyage on Lake Wakatipu, from Kingston to Queenstown.
 12 November: 'Black Tuesday', the peak of confrontation during the Waihi miners' strike. One trade unionist is killed.

Undated
The School Medical Service begins in New Zealand. 
 Construction of the new Parliament Buildings commences.

Arts and literature

See 1912 in art, 1912 in literature

Music

See: 1912 in music

Film

See: The River Wanganui and Méliès' Star Film Company; 1912 in film, List of New Zealand feature films, Cinema of New Zealand, :Category:1912 films.

Sport

Chess
 The 25th National Chess Championship was held in Napier, and was won by W.E. Mason of Wellington, his third title.

Golf

Men's
 The sixth New Zealand Open championship was won by J.A. Clements (his third victory).
 The 20th National Amateur Championships were held in Wellington 
 Men: B.B. Wood (Christchurch)

Women's
 Matchplay: Miss ? Collins - 2nd title 
 Strokeplay: Mrs G. Williams - 2nd title

Horse racing

Harness racing
 New Zealand Trotting Cup: Albert H.
 Auckland Trotting Cup: Mandarene

Olympic Games
New Zealand competed in the Australasian team. Two New Zealanders won Olympic medals, see Swimming, Tennis below.

Rugby union
 Auckland defended the Ranfurly Shield against Taranaki (6-5), Wellington (12-0) and Otago (5-5)

Soccer
Provincial league champions:
	Auckland:	Everton Auckland
	Canterbury:	Christchurch Nomads
	Otago:	Mornington Dunedin
	Southland:	Nightcaps
	Taranaki:	Kaponga
	Wanganui:	Eastbrooke
	Wellington:	Hospital

Swimming
 Malcolm Champion was a member of the Australasian team which won the gold medal in the Men's 4 × 200 m Freestyle Relay at the 1912 Summer Olympics in Stockholm.

Tennis
 The Davis Cup final was held in Melbourne, Australia. The Australasian team of Norman Brookes (Aus), Roger Heath (Aus) and Alfred Dunlop (NZ, doubles) lost to Great Britain, 2-3
Anthony Wilding won the men's singles at the Wimbledon Championship for a third year in succession.
 Anthony Wilding won the bronze medal in men's singles (indoor) at the 1912 Summer Olympics in Stockholm.

Births
 1 January: Martyn Finlay, politician.
 5 March: Jack Marshall, politician.
 30 March: Jack Cowie, cricketer.
 3 April: Dorothy Eden, novelist.
 20 May: Alfred E. Allen, politician.
 23 May: Connie Soljak (Purdue) trade unionist, anti-abortion campaigner.
 24 May: Joan Hammond, opera singer.
 26 May: Eric Halstead, politician.
 15 June: Oscar Natzka, opera singer. 
 31 July: Harry Ayres (1912–1987), New Zealand guide and mountaineer
 17 August: Elsie Locke, left-wing activist.
 30 August: Nancy Wake, resistance fighter.
 20 September: Richard Wild, 9th Chief Justice of New Zealand.
 15 October: George Laking, diplomat.
 4 November: Henry Gifford 'Giff' Vivian, cricketer.
 9 December: Denis Glover, poet and publisher.
 Rosemary Firth, ethnologist.

Deaths
 5 February: Henry Samuel Fitzherbert, lawyer and politician.
 7 April Isaac Wilson, politician and businessman.
 7 May James McGowan, politician.
 18 May William Lee Rees, politician.
 8 July William Gilbert Mair, soldier and judge 
 27 September: Robert Houston, politician.
 10 October: James Mackay, farmer and politician.
 30 October: William Steward, politician
 9 November: Mahuta Tāwhiao, 3rd Māori King

See also
List of years in New Zealand
Timeline of New Zealand history
History of New Zealand
Military history of New Zealand
Timeline of the New Zealand environment
Timeline of New Zealand's links with Antarctica

References

External links

 
New Zealand
1910s in New Zealand
New Zealand